When a Girl Loves may refer to: 

 When a Girl Loves (1919 film), an American silent film directed by Phillips Smalley and Lois Weber
 When a Girl Loves (1924 film), an American silent film directed by Victor Halperin